Harlem/Lake, announced as Harlem, is a station on the Chicago Transit Authority's 'L' system, serving the Green Line. It is the northwestern terminus of the Green Line.

History

The station opened on October 28, 1962 and was formerly called Harlem Terminal. The Lake Street Elevated went further through Oak Park and was built to Marion Street in 1901 and extended just a few blocks west past Harlem Avenue to Forest Park station on May 20, 1910. It was built at street-level and the tracks also paralleled the adjacent Chicago & North Western Railroad and the street-level operation began to result a number of crossing accidents for both railroads, typically due to pedestrians and wagon drivers failing to take note of approaching trains. Neither the "L" nor the C&NW had any type of crossing protection originally. Harlem was a consolidation of the Forest Park and Marion stations.

Location
The station is located at 1 South Harlem Avenue and is the northwestern terminus of the Green Line. Though the station is named Harlem/Lake, Lake Street does not intersect with the station; the station is located at Harlem Avenue and South Boulevard. The station is next to the Oak Park Metra commuter railroad station. It is located between the Oak Park and Forest Park boundary line at Harlem Avenue.

Bus and rail connections
CTA
 90 Harlem 

Pace
 307 Harlem 
 309 Lake Street 
 313 St. Charles Road 
 318 West North Avenue 

Metra
 Union Pacific/West Line

See also
Harlem (CTA Blue Line Congress branch station)
Harlem (CTA Blue Line O'Hare branch station)

Notes and references

Notes

References

External links

Harlem/Lake Station Page
Harlem Avenue entrance from Google Maps Street View
Marion Street entrance (also to Metra) from Google Maps Street View

CTA Green Line stations
Chicago "L" terminal stations
Railway stations in the United States opened in 1962
Oak Park, Illinois
Forest Park, Illinois